The Lindsley House is a historic two-story house in Table Rock, Nebraska. It was built with limestone in 1872 as a hotel run by Mrs Lindsley until 1897. It was later remodelled as a private residence, and the porch was built in 1912. It was remodelled as a bed and breakfast in 1989. The house has been listed on the National Register of Historic Places since March 25, 1999.

References

Hotel buildings on the National Register of Historic Places in Nebraska
National Register of Historic Places in Pawnee County, Nebraska
Houses completed in 1872
1872 establishments in Nebraska